János Sylvester sometimes known as János Erdősi (1504–1552) was a 16th-century Hungarian figure of the Reformation, and also a poet and grammarian, who was the first to translate the New Testament into Hungarian in 1541.

Life

He was born into a middle-class family at Szinervaralja in Hungary.

He was a disciple of Erasmus studying at the University of Krakow 1526/27.

He went to study at the university of Wittenberg in central Germany in 1529 and returned 1534 to 1536, studying theology under Martin Luther and Philip Melanchthon. In Wittenberg he lived in accommodation on Schlossplatz east of the Schlosskirche.

On return to Hungary he set up one of the first printing presses in Ujsziget.

In 1543 he moved to the University of Vienna to teach Latin and Greek.

He died on 6 May 1552.

Publications
Rosarium (1527) the first poem in Hungarian
Grammatica Hungarolatina (1539) the first document to establish "standardised spelling" in Hungarian
The New Testament (first Hungarian translation) (1541)

He is also credited with creating the idea of an "essay".

References

1504 births
1552 deaths
People from Seini
Academic staff of the University of Vienna
Translators of the Bible into Hungarian
16th-century Hungarian people